William West (1 February 1612 – December, 1670) was an English politician who sat in the House of Commons variously between 1653 and 1660. He fought on the Parliamentary side in the English Civil War.

West was a colonel in the Parliamentary army by 1653 and served as MP for Lancashire in the Barebones Parliament. In 1659 he acquired the manor of Middleton, Lancashire.

Also in 1659, West was elected Member of Parliament for Lancaster in the Third Protectorate Parliament.   He was re-elected MP for Lancaster for the Convention Parliament in 1660.
 
West died at the age of 58 and was buried on 7 December 1670.

West's first wife Juliana died in 1666. He subsequently married Frances Kirkby, daughter of Roger Kirkby of Kirkby Ireleth.

References

1612 births
1670 deaths
Members of the Parliament of England (pre-1707) for Lancashire
English MPs 1653 (Barebones)
English MPs 1659
English MPs 1660